The Net class were a class of boom defence vessels of the Royal Navy and Royal Australian Navy during World War II.

Ships
Of the eleven ships of the class ten were built in shipyards in northern England and Scotland, while the eleventh was built in Sydney, Australia.

Royal Navy

 
 

HMS Sonnet (Z47)

Royal Australian Navy

See also
 Bar class boom defence vessel

References

External links

World War II net laying ships
Auxiliary gateship classes